Jay Livingston (born Jacob Harold Levison, March 28, 1915 – October 17, 2001) was an American composer best known as half of a song-writing duo with Ray Evans that specialized in songs composed for films. Livingston wrote music and Evans the lyrics.

Early life and career
Livingston was born in McDonald, Pennsylvania to Jewish parents. He had an older sister, Vera, and a younger brother, Alan W. Livingston, who became an executive with Capitol Records, and later with NBC television.

Livingston studied piano with Harry Archer in Pittsburgh, Pennsylvania. He attended the University of Pennsylvania, where he organized a dance band and met Evans, a fellow student in the band. Though they began writing together in 1937, Livingston and Evans did not hit the top until 1946, when they set the music publishing business on fire with "To Each His Own," which reached number one on the Billboard charts for three different artists, and occupied the top five positions on the "Most Played On the Air" chart for four different weeks (August 24, 1946, and again on September 7, September 14 and October 5, five versions appeared simultaneously in the Top Ten). "Buttons and Bows" (1947) was their next multi-million seller, with four artists reaching the top ten in 1948, and won the Academy Award for Best Song. They finished off the decade with 1949's "Mona Lisa", which was a chart hit for seven popular and two country artists in 1950, sold a million for Nat King Cole, and won the pair another Best Song Oscar.  Their third Oscar came in 1956 for the song "Que Sera, Sera (Whatever Will Be, Will Be)," featured in the movie The Man Who Knew Too Much. They also wrote "Tammy" for the movie Tammy and the Bachelor in 1957.

Livingston and Evans wrote popular TV themes for shows including Bonanza and Mister Ed, which Livingston sang. They also wrote the Christmas song "Silver Bells" in 1951, for the film The Lemon Drop Kid, initially calling it "Tinkle Bells" but changed it to "Silver" because of a common connotation of "tinkle", as well as "Never Let Me Go" for the 1956 film The Scarlet Hour. Johnny Mathis sang Livingston's song "All The Time," among others.

Livingston appeared as himself with Evans in the New Year's Eve party scene of the 1950 film Sunset Boulevard, which featured his future sister-in-law, Nancy Olson.

Honors
Livingston is an inductee in the Songwriters Hall of Fame. In 2004, the Pennsylvania Historical and Museum Commission installed a historical marker in McDonald, Pennsylvania, commemorating his achievements.

Death
Livingston died in Los Angeles and was interred there in Westwood Memorial Park Cemetery, his tombstone reading, "Que Será, Será".

His wife, actress Shirley Mitchell, died on November 11, 2013, at 94.

Work on Broadway
Oh, Captain! (1958) – musical – co-composer and co-lyricist with Ray Evans – Tony nomination for Best Musical
Let It Ride (1961) – musical – co-composer and co-lyricist with Ray Evans
Sugar Babies (1979) – revue – featured songwriter with Ray Evans for "The Sugar Baby Bounce"

References

External links
Jay Livingston obituary from The New York Times
Jay Livingston biography 
Jay Livingston - Lifetime Sammy Film Music Award

 (begins at 41:32) appearance with Chuck Schaden and members of the Gildersleeve cast: Willard Waterman, Mary Lee Robb and Shirley Mitchell. Songwriter Jay Livingston (Shirley's husband) entertains with a mini- concert featuring his many hit songs. Recorded at the Museum of Broadcast Communications, Chicago. (113 minutes).
Jay Livingston Interview NAMM Oral History Library (1995)

1915 births
2001 deaths
20th-century American composers
20th-century American male musicians
American film score composers
American male film score composers
American musical theatre composers
Broadway composers and lyricists
Best Original Song Academy Award-winning songwriters
Burials at Westwood Village Memorial Park Cemetery
Jewish American film score composers
Jewish American songwriters
Male musical theatre composers
People from McDonald, Pennsylvania
Songwriters from Pennsylvania
Wharton School of the University of Pennsylvania alumni
20th-century American Jews
American male songwriters